Jeff Simmons is the name of:
 Jeff Simmons (musician) (born 1949), former member of Frank Zappa's Mothers of Invention
 Jeff Simmons (racing driver) (born 1976), American race car driver
 Jeff Simmons (American football) (born 1960), NFL player

See also
Geoff Simmons (born 1974), New Zealand economist and politician
Geoffrey Simmons (born 1943), American medical doctor, author, and intelligent design advocate